Lists of wind farms include:

List of onshore wind farms
List of offshore wind farms

Wind farms by country 
 List of wind farms in Australia
 List of wind farms in Canada
 List of wind farms in China
 List of wind farms in Denmark
 List of wind farms in India
 List of wind farms in Iran
 List of wind farms in Japan
 List of wind farms in Jordan
 List of wind farms in Kosovo
 List of wind farms in Latvia
 List of wind farms in Lithuania
 List of wind farms in Morocco
 List of wind farms in the Republic of Ireland
 List of wind farms in Romania
 List of wind farms in South Africa
 List of wind farms in Sri Lanka
 List of wind farms in Sweden
 List of wind farms in Turkey
 List of wind farms in the United Kingdom
 List of wind farms in the United States
 List of wind farms in Uruguay

See also
:Category:Lists of wind farms

 
Lists of engineering lists